Shahrud (also Romanized as Shāhrūd; also known as Shāhrū) is a village in Zaz-e Sharqi Rural District, Zaz va Mahru District, Aligudarz County, Lorestan Province, Iran.In the 2006 census, its population was 102, in 16 families.

References 

Towns and villages in Aligudarz County